Crossover is a term applied to musical works or performers who appeal to different types of audience. This can be seen, for example, (especially in the United States) when a song appears on two or more of the record charts which track differing musical styles or genres. If the second chart combines genres, such as a "Hot 100" list, the work is not a crossover.

In some contexts the term "crossover" can have negative connotations associated with cultural appropriation, implying the dilution of a music's distinctive qualities to appeal to mass tastes. For example, in the early years of rock and roll, many songs originally recorded by African-American musicians were re-recorded by white artists such as Pat Boone in a more toned-down style, often with changed lyrics, that lacked the hard edge of the original versions. These covers were popular with a much broader audience.

Crossover frequently results from the appearance of the music in a film soundtrack. For instance, Sacred Harp music experienced a spurt of crossover popularity as a result of its appearance in the 2003 film Cold Mountain, and bluegrass music experienced a revival due to the reception of 2000's O Brother, Where Art Thou?.

Classical crossover

Classical crossover broadly encompasses both classical music that has become popularized and a wide variety of popular music forms performed in a classical manner or by classical artists. It can also refer to collaborations between classical and popular performers, as well as music that blends elements of classical music (including operatic and symphonic) with popular music (including pop, rock, middle of the road, and Latin, among other types). Pop vocalists and musicians, opera singers, classical instrumentalists, and occasionally rock groups primarily perform classical crossover. Although the phenomenon was long common in the music world, the name "classical crossover" was coined by record companies in the 1980s. It has gained in popularity since the 1990s and has acquired its own Billboard chart.

Popular classics

Particular works of classical music have become popular among individuals who mostly listen to popular music, sometimes appearing on non-classical charts. Some classical works that achieved crossover status in the twentieth century include the Canon in D by Johann Pachelbel, the Symphony No. 3 by Henryk Górecki, and the second movement of Mozart's Piano Concerto No. 21, K. 467 (from its appearance in the 1967 film Elvira Madigan).

Such popularity has been assisted by the use of classical music in advertising campaigns. For example, the long-running British Airways advertisements familiarised a large viewing public with the song Aria by New Age artist Yanni, a piece itself based on a duet from the opera Lakmé by Léo Delibes.

Another means of generating vast popularity for the classics has been through their use as inspirational anthems in sports settings. The aria "Nessun Dorma" from Puccini's Turandot, especially Luciano Pavarotti's version, has become indissolubly linked with soccer.

Classical performers
Within the classical recording industry, the term "crossover" is applied particularly to classical artists' recordings of popular repertoire such as Broadway show tunes. Two examples of this are Lesley Garrett's excursions into musical comedy and also José Carreras's recording West Side Story, as well as Teresa Stratas' recording Showboat. Soprano Eileen Farrell is generally considered to be one of the first classical singers to have a successful crossover recording with her 1960 album I've Got a Right to Sing the Blues.

A popular pioneering figure in classical crossover was classically trained tenor and film star Mario Lanza, although the term "crossover" did not yet exist at the time of his greatest popularity in the 1950s. Signed to RCA Victor as an artist on its premium Red Seal label, Lanza's albums appealed to more than just classical music audiences. His recording of "Be My Love" from his second film, The Toast of New Orleans, hit Number One on the Billboard pop singles chart in February 1951 and sold more than two million copies, a feat no classical artist before or since has achieved. Lanza recorded two other million-selling singles that made Billboard's top ten, "The Loveliest Night of the Year" and "Because You're Mine". Five of Lanza's albums hit Number One on Billboard's pop album chart between 1951 and 1955. The Great Caruso was the first and to date is the only recording composed exclusively of operatic arias to reach Number One on the U.S. pop album charts. The Student Prince, released in 1954, was Number One for 42 weeks.

Arguably another early pioneer of crossover was the twentieth century composer Kurt Weill. A writer of avant garde serious music, his collaborations with playwright Bertolt Brecht on projects such as The Threepenny Opera nevertheless gave an early indication of his interest in writing in an easily accessible, popular musical style. This trend in his work came to full fruition in later life in the United States, where he switched primarily to writing the scores for Broadway musicals such as Knickerbocker Holiday and One Touch of Venus. Some of the hits from those shows, such as September Song and Speak Low, are better remembered than the musicals from which they came.

The first Three Tenors concert in 1990 was a landmark in which Luciano Pavarotti, José Carreras and Plácido Domingo brought a combination of opera, Neapolitan folksong, musical theatre and pop to a vast television audience. This laid the foundations for the modern flourishing of classical crossover.

The aspiration of classical singers to appeal to a wide pop audience is exemplified by the career of Rhydian. Classically trained, Rhydian appeared in the UK version of the pop talent show X Factor (4th series, 2007, placed second). His four albums and subsequent appearances have straddled pop, classical, musical theatre and religious television fields. This also applies to classically trained instrumentalists, such as Vanessa Mae, Bond, Escala, David Garrett, Taylor Davis, Stjepan Hauser, Luka Šulić, 2CELLOS, Eric Stanley and Catya Maré.

Collaborations between classical and popular performers have included Sting and Edin Karamazov's album Songs from the Labyrinth. A collaboration between Freddie Mercury and soprano Montserrat Caballé resulted in the worldwide hit "Barcelona". R&B singer Mariah Carey performed a live duet with her mother Patricia, who is an opera singer, of the Christmas song - O Come, All Ye Faithful. Welsh mezzo-soprano Katherine Jenkins performed a duet with rock singer Michael Bolton of O Holy Night. Singers and instrumentalists from the classical tradition, Andreas Dorschel has argued, run the risk of losing the sophistication of the genre(s) they were trained in, when they try to perform rock music, without coming up to the often rough and wild qualities of the latter.

Pop performers in classical and mixed genres
Pop singers have consistently sought to attain a symphonic or operatic dimension in their writing and performance. Early examples include The Moody Blues's Days of Future Passed (1967), "Genuine Imitation Life" from Genuine Imitation Life Gazette (1969) by The Four Seasons, Deep Purple's Concerto for Group and Orchestra (1969) and Gemini Suite Live (1970) as well as Rick Wakeman's Journey to the Centre of the Earth (1974), The Myths and Legends of King Arthur and the Knights of the Round Table (1975), and Une Nuit A Paris, a miniature rock opera from The Original Soundtrack (1975) by 10cc. A more recent example is Metallica's S&M (1999). Neil Diamond won a Grammy for his soundtrack for the movie Jonathan Livingston Seagull (1973), in which he, aided by composer/conductor Lee Holdridge, wrote and recorded songs containing classical, pop, and religious elements.

Italian pop tenor Andrea Bocelli, who is the biggest-selling singer in the history of classical music, has been described as the king of classical crossover. British soprano Sarah Brightman is also considered a crossover classical artist, having released albums of classical, folk, pop and musical-theatre music. Brightman dislikes the classical crossover label, though she has said she understands the need to categorize music. In the 2008 Polish release of her Symphony album she sings "I Will Be with You (Where the Lost Ones Go)" with Polish tenor Andrzej Lampert, another artist who has performed in both classical and non-classical styles, as well as having actually obtained full musical training and academic degrees in both (though operatic singing is his main professional focus). In addition, Welsh mezzo-soprano Katherine Jenkins has achieved international fame via her crossover albums.

Crossover country

Country-western music, up through the early 1950s, had a distinct, Appalachian sound that was generally popular only in rural areas in the south and west; for others, it was an acquired taste. Arthur Smith was an early country crossover success with his 1945 instrumental "Guitar Boogie." Rockabilly artists such as Carl Perkins, Elvis Presley and the early works of Johnny Cash managed crossover hits in country and rock music during a brief period in the mid-1950s. The first sustained and deliberate attempt to aim country music at a mainstream pop audience was the Nashville sound; Patsy Cline was a particularly successful example of this style, charting several pop and country hits from the late 1950s until her death in 1963.

During the late 1960s, Glen Campbell began aiming his music at the mainstream pop charts, adding strings, horns and other pop music flourishes to such songs as "Wichita Lineman", "By the Time I Get to Phoenix", and "Galveston", which allowed his music to chart both in country and pop. While such artists as Lynn Anderson and Charlie Rich followed Campbell's example into the early 1970s, it was Dolly Parton and Kenny Rogers who, during the mid to late 1970s came to personify the concept of country pop crossover, with both artists maintaining a consistent presence on both the pop and country charts well into the mid-1980s, culminating in their duet, "Islands in the Stream", which topped the country and pop charts in 1983.

Others, like John Denver, Olivia Newton-John, The Eagles, Faron Young, Willie Nelson, Dottie West, Alabama, Eddie Rabbitt, Ronnie Milsap, Anne Murray, and Crystal Gayle began successful in country but made the crossover to pop music. Conversely, Conway Twitty, England Dan Seals, former Righteous Brother Bill Medley, Exile, and Merrill Osmond and the Osmond Brothers crossed over from pop to country. By the late 1980s, as country moved to a much more traditional sound, pop and country crossovers had become exceedingly rare (only Roy Orbison's posthumous "You Got It" would top both charts in this time frame).

1990s and 2000s crossover country

In the 1990s many country artists experienced huge crossover success. These artists include Garth Brooks, Shania Twain, Billy Ray Cyrus, Tim McGraw, Faith Hill, Dixie Chicks, Jo Dee Messina, Martina McBride, Reba McEntire, Lonestar, Sara Evans and LeAnn Rimes.

The early 2000s also saw continued success of these artists. Lee Ann Womack scored a big hit with "I Hope You Dance". The Dixie Chicks had continued success with a less mainstream country-pop sound when they released their album Home in 2002. However, by the mid-2000s there were fewer country acts having crossover success.

Carrie Underwood, who emerged as both a pop star and a country musician as a result of the TV series American Idol (a show that was at its peak in popularity at the time Underwood won the contest), became a crossover success with hits on both the country and pop charts. Underwood would become the first of several country musicians, including another American Idol winner Scotty McCreery, who would find success on the pop charts beginning in the late 2000s.

Late 2000s and 2010s crossover country

Concurrent with Underwood's crossover success was the debut of teen singer-songwriter Taylor Swift. Swift initially specialized in country-flavored coffee house songs such as "Tim McGraw" and "Teardrops on My Guitar," but as her success grew, she increasingly began moving her musical career toward pop. Beginning with "The Story of Us" in 2010, Swift started releasing some of her songs either primarily, or solely, as pop tunes. Many of the songs Swift recorded for the country and pop markets also achieved wide success (especially "We Are Never Ever Getting Back Together," which topped both charts), turning her into a leading example of a country crossover phenomenon, with various critics lauding her as the "next Shania Twain". A change to the Billboard methodology for compiling charts such as country charts directly benefited crossover artists such as Swift by taking into account airplay on non-country stations.

Other artists who have found success on both pop and country in the early 2010s, in addition to the continued success of Swift and Underwood, have been Lady Antebellum and The Band Perry.

OtherFlorida Georgia Line also crossed over to the pop charts with a remixed version of their song "Cruise". Several sub-genres existThe popularity of bro-country by artists such as Luke Bryan has increased the crossover success of country artists, a tradition which has further continued through the infusion of R&B music by artists including Brett Eldredge, Thomas Rhett and Sam Hunt.

Latin crossover artists

1980s crossover acts

Gloria Estefan is the most successful crossover performer in Latin music to date. She began crossing over to English music in 1984. Estefan at the time was with the Miami Sound Machine. Their more successful follow-up album, Primitive Love, was released in 1985, launching three Top 10 hits on the Billboard Hot 100: "Conga" (U.S. #10), "Words Get in the Way" (U.S. #5), and "Bad Boy" (U.S. #8) became follow–up hits in the U.S. and around the world. "Words Get in the Way" reached No. 1 on the US Hot Adult Contemporary Tracks chart, establishing that the group could perform pop ballads as successfully as dance tunes. The song "Hot Summer Nights" was also released that year and was part of the blockbuster movie Top Gun. Since then Estefan has bridged between both the English and Latin world for the mid to late 1980s, 1990s and 2000s.

1990s crossover acts

In the mid '90s, Selena was gaining prominence within the Hispanic music world. Primarily marketed as a Tejano music artist, Selena's success was met with rhythmic Cumbia recordings. After bypassing several barriers within the Tejano industry, she quickly superseded other Latin artist acts and earned the title "Queen of Tejano Music". After being presented with a Grammy for Selena Live!, Selena became the first Latin artist to release four number–one singles, in 1994. With a meteoric rise in popularity, Selena was presented with the opportunity to record an English-crossover album.

Unfortunately, months before the release of her English album, Selena was murdered by her fan club president, on 31 March 1995, in Corpus Christi, Texas. Selena's incomplete album, titled Dreaming of You, was released in July 1995, topping the Billboard 200. Selena's songs "Dreaming of You" and "I Could Fall In Love" quickly became mainstream hits, and the album became among the "Top ten best-selling debuts of all time" along with being among the "best-selling debuts for a female artist". Selena became the first Latin artist, male or female, to have ever debuted with a No. 1 album, partially in Spanish.

Despite, and perhaps fueled by, Selena's death and crossover success, the "Latin explosion" continued in the late '90s. At that time, a handful of rising stars who shared a Latin heritage were touted as proof that sounds from Latin countries were infiltrating the pop mainstream. These included Ricky Martin, Thalía, Marc Anthony, Enrique Iglesias and Jennifer Lopez, who rendered a Golden Globe performance as Selena on film. 
Like Estefan and Selena, many of these artists, including some who recorded in English after gaining fame singing in Spanish, had been influenced at least as much by American music and culture.

Ricky Martin gained success with "La Copa de la Vida", which Martin made a major hit in an English version when he was chosen to sing the anthem of the 1998 FIFA World Cup. "The Cup of Life"/"La Copa de la Vida" reached number one on the charts in 60 countries and in the United States the English version went to No. 45 on the Hot 100 charts. The song went Platinum in France, Sweden and in Australia, where it ultimately became the number one single of the year. The song was awarded "Pop Song of the Year" at the 1999 Lo Nuestro Awards.

Martin at the Grammy Awards was booked to sing on the show's live TV broadcast. The now-legendary performance of "The Cup of Life" stopped the show, earning Martin an unexpected standing ovation and introducing the star to the mainstream American audience. Martin capped off the evening by winning the award for Best Latin Pop Performance. Vuelve became Martin's first Top 40 album on Billboard Top 200 Albums chart in the U.S., where it was certified Platinum by the RIAA. The album notably went to No. 1 in Norway for three weeks, going on to sell eight million copies worldwide.

Martin prepared his first English album in 1999, as the first and most prominent single was "Livin' la Vida Loca", which reached number one in many countries around the world, including the United States, the United Kingdom, Argentina, Australia, Brazil, France, Greece, India, Israel, Italy, Japan, Guatemala, Mexico, Russia, Turkey and South Africa. He followed up with the hit "She's All I Ever Had", which peaked at No. 2 on The Billboard Hot 100. This album became one of the top-selling albums of 1999, and was certified seven times platinum, selling over 22 million copies worldwide to date.

Also in 1999, attempting to emulate the crossover success of Gloria Estefan, Selena and Ricky Martin in the anglophone market, Marc Anthony released an English-language Latin Pop self-titled album with the US Top 5 hit single "I Need to Know", and the Spanish version "Dímelo". Other hits include "When I Dream At Night" and "My Baby You". His song "You Sang To Me" was featured in Runaway Bride. The successful dance version was re-mixed by Dutch producer Rene Van Verseveld. The foray was considered a mixed success, partly because it alienated his traditional salsa fans, though "Da La Vuelta" (not a Spanish version of any of the songs) was a salsa song and was a hit. Another note is that the song "That's Okay" has more of a salsa tune than pop.

Enrique Iglesias had begun a successful crossover career into the English language music market. Thanks to other successful crossover acts, Latino artists and music had a great surge in popularity in mainstream music. Iglesias' contribution to the soundtrack of Will Smith's movie Wild Wild West, "Bailamos", became a number–one hit in the US. After the success of "Bailamos", several mainstream record labels were eager to sign Enrique. Signing a multi-album deal after weeks of negotiations with Interscope, Iglesias recorded and released his first full CD in English, Enrique. The pop album, with some Latin influences, took two months to complete and contained a duet with Whitney Houston called "Could I Have This Kiss Forever" and a cover of the Bruce Springsteen song "Sad Eyes". The album's third single, "Be With You", became his second number one.

Jennifer Lopez's debut album On the 6, a reference to the 6 subway line she used to take growing up in Castle Hill, was released on 1 June 1999, and reached the top ten of the Billboard 200. The album featured the Billboard Hot 100 number-one lead single, "If You Had My Love", as well as the top ten hit "Waiting for Tonight", and even the Spanish version of the song "Una Noche Mas" became a hit as well. The album also featured a Spanish language, Latin-flavored duet "No Me Ames" with Marc Anthony, who later would become her husband before their divorce in 2014. Though "No Me Ames" never had a commercial release, it reached number one on the U.S. Hot Latin Tracks.

Also LInda Ronstadt, who performed alongside Dolly Parton and Emmylou Harris in Trio I and Trio II.

2000s crossover acts

After the '90s, there were very few crossover acts that became successful in the 2000s. The only ones who proved successful were Shakira, Thalía, Paulina Rubio, Jennifer Lopez and Christina Aguilera, although the latter started at first in English and then turned to Spanish. Both Ricky Martin and Enrique Iglesias retained their roles as one of the most successful crossover artists that decade.

Colombian singer Shakira's third studio album and first English language album, Laundry Service (Servicio De Lavanderia, in Latin America and Spain) was released on 13 November 2001. The album debuted at number three on the U.S. Billboard 200 chart, selling over 200,000 records in its first week. Laundry Service was later certified triple platinum by the RIAA in June 2004 as well and thus helped to establish Shakira's musical presence in the mainstream North American market.

Jennifer Lopez officially released her first full Spanish-language album, Como Ama una Mujer, in March 2007. Her now-ex husband, singer Marc Anthony, produced the album with Estefano, except for "Qué Hiciste", which Anthony co-produced with Julio Reyes. The album peaked at number ten on the Billboard 200, number one on the U.S. Top Latin Albums for four straight weeks, and on the U.S. Latin Pop Albums for seven straight weeks. The album did well in Europe, peaking at number three on the albums chart, mainly due to the big success in countries such as Switzerland, Italy, Spain, France, Belgium, Greece, Germany, Austria, and Portugal.

On 24 July 2007 Billboard magazine reported that Lopez and now ex-husband Marc Anthony would "co-headline" a worldwide tour called "Juntos en Concierto" starting in New Jersey on 29 September. Tickets went on sale 10 August. The tour was a mix of her current music, older tunes and Spanish music. In a later press release, Lopez announced a detailed itinerary. The tour launched 28 September 2007 at the Mark G. Etess Arena and ended on 7 November 2007 at the American Airlines Arena in Miami, Florida. The lead single, "Qué Hiciste," was officially released to radio stations in January 2007. Since then, it has peaked at 86 on the U.S. Billboard Hot 100 and number one on the Hot Latin Songs and the Hot Dance Club Play. It also went top ten on the European chart. The video for the song was the first Spanish-language video to peak at number one on MTV's Total Request Live daily countdown.

Lopez won an American Music Award as the Favorite Latin Artist in 2007. With Como Ama Una Mujer, Jennifer Lopez is one of the few performers to debut in the top 10 of the Billboard 200 with a Spanish album.

Jay-Z took part in a crossover record in 2004. He teamed up with rock band Linkin Park and produced the hit mash-up song "Numb/Encore". The song, while boasting a majority of Jay-Z's lyrics and hip-hop style, the genre of the song would be considered rock because of the tropes of rock music included in the piece. George Nelson, producer of television series "The Get Down" wrote an article titled Death and Rhythm of Blues. In the article, Nelson discusses the appealing to audiences of other races. With the production of "Numb/Encore", Jay-Z and Linkin Park were able to not only crossover genres, but consumer groups as well.

2010s crossover acts
American opera and classical crossover singer Fernando Varela has performed in fully staged operas, as a member of the classical crossover trio Forte Tenors, and has toured both with David Foster, and independently as a crossover artist.

In 2017, "Despacito", a song by Luis Fonsi and Daddy Yankee, reached the top of the Billboard Hot 100 after the release of a bilingual remix featuring Justin Bieber. The song would tie a record for the most weeks spent at the number-one spot in the Hot 100's history, and reached the top of singles charts in 47 countries.

Following Despacito's success, other Latin songs also found a market, including J Balvin and Willy William's "Mi Gente" , which became a top 40 hit in the U.S. and United Kingdom, and "Súbeme la Radio" by Enrique Iglesias, which reached the top 10 in the U.K.

Christian crossover artists

The term "crossover artist" may refer to musical performers and groups that are Christian music artists, who many times originally are marketed through Christian record labels, radio stations, churches and other Christian media but who start selling in mainstream secular markets as well. Other times, crossover artists may start out in the mainstream market but have Christian undertones or themes if not overtly Christian. The term "crossing over" is used to describe when an artist who had started predominantly in Christian markets starts receiving mainstream success. Some people may feel that the artist is betraying the church for fame or glory, while others may see this as a great opportunity for the artist spread the message of their Christian beliefs.

The first major artist crossover was by Amy Grant, with her 1985 album Unguarded and 1991 hit song "Baby Baby" from the highest-selling Christian album Heart in Motion. The albums and single were distributed by a Christian label but received heavy play on pop radio stations and were chart-toppers on the Billboard charts. Since then, many artists have been labeled as "crossover artist" regardless of whether they originally intended to market to the Christian market, secular market, or both. The most notable recent Christian crossover artists are Lauren Daigle, Kirk Franklin, Switchfoot, The Afters, Relient K, and many of the artists on Tooth & Nail Records such as MxPx, Underoath, Emery, Lifehouse, Zao, and Dead Poetic.

Christian and country artists have experienced significant crossover. Much of Carrie Underwood's work has been overtly Christian, including "Jesus, Take the Wheel" and "Temporary Home" , "Something in the Water." Other notable Christian-country crossovers have included "Changed" by Rascal Flatts, "A Living Prayer" by Alison Krauss and "Believe" by Brooks & Dunn. For a time in the late 2000s, the God's Country Radio Network specialized in Christian-country crossovers, such was the extent of the body of music that fit into both genera.

A more unusual example of a crossover artist is Katy Perry. She released a little known, commercially unsuccessful Christian album in 2001 under her birth name, Katy Hudson. She then went on to release commercially successful secular albums in 2008, 2010, and 2013. There are still some noticeable Christian elements in some of her secular music, particularly her later work, such as "Who Am I Living For" (2010) and "By The Grace of God" (2013).

Jazz crossover and rock crossover

Besides describing music of a distinct genre that becomes broadly popular, the musical term "crossover" suggested mixed genres. "Fusion" is a more common term for this phenomenon. Examples include jazz fusion and world music. Example albums of crossover jazz plus classical music were albums of Deodato, Jean Luc Ponty and Bob James. Bob James One (CTI, 1974), contained the song "Feel Like Making Love", which Roberta Flack already had as a hit. Radio stations played this song and contributed to the success of album One. The album was notable for adapting classical music to a modern-day scene, e.g. "In the Garden" was based on Pachelbel's Canon in D and "Night on Bald Mountain" was a cover of Modest Mussorgsky's composition of the same name.

Other examples of crossover in music are bands that play a mix of genres such as funk, rap, rock, metal and punk, for instance bands such as Urban Dance Squad, Faith No More, Red Hot Chili Peppers, Suicidal Tendencies, D.R.I., Primus, Linkin Park, Rage Against the Machine, System of a Down and 311.

See also
 Jazz fusion
 World music
 Folk music
 Eclecticism in art
 Polystylism

References

Bibliography

Lonergan, David F. Hit Records, 1950–1975. Scarecrow Press, 2004.

Further reading
Szwed, John F. (2005). Crossovers: Essays on Race, Music, And American Culture. .
Brackett, David (Winter 1994). "The Politics and Practice of 'Crossover' in American Popular Music, 1963–65" The Musical Quarterly 78:4.
George, Nelson. (1988). The Death of Rhythm & Blues. New York: Pantheon Books.

External links
 Article on the definition of Classical Crossover